Romanovo is a rural locality (a selo) and the administrative center of Romanovsky Selsoviet, Pankrushikhinsky District, Altai Krai, Russia. The population was 456 as of 2013. There are 10 streets.

Geography 
Romanovo is located 27 km northeast of Pankrushikha (the district's administrative centre) by road. Kyzyltu is the nearest rural locality.

References 

Rural localities in Pankrushikhinsky District